Movistar Arena is a 15,000-seat multi-purpose indoor arena in the neighbourhood of Villa Crespo, in Buenos Aires, Argentina. It opened in 2019 as a replacement for the DirecTV Arena, it is located in the terrains property of the football club Atlético Atlanta. Telefónica's cell phone division Movistar, bought the terrains and acquired the arena's naming rights until 2057. The arena, gestioned by multinational company ASM Global, is the most important concert infrastructure in Argentina as well as the second largest indoor arena in the country.

History 
The property where the arena has been built was owned by Club Atlético Atlanta until 1991 when the club had to sell it to face bankruptcy. It was acquired by a company that had been closed for more than fifteen years and in a state of abandonment, which is why, in 2005, the property was expropriated by the Government of the city of Buenos Aires and given in concession again to the football club.

The definitive construction of the stadium began in 2014 in charge of company Lugones Center. It was later announced that it could not continue due to lack of funds. Construction was halted in 2015, leaving a half-finished concrete structure abandoned. Specialized company Buenos Aires Arena S.A resumed the project at the end of 2017. In order for the venue to have an experienced and international level of operation and services, international firm ASM Global was contracted as its operator.

The arena opened on 1 November 2019 with a concert by Tini as part of her Quiero Volver Tour, with the special participation of Karina and Luis Fonsi. The recital was broadcast live on Movistar Play, the social networks of Movistar Argentina and TNcom.

Transport 
Movistar Arena is located one block from Avenida Corrientes, Avenida Dorrego and Avenida Juan B. Justo. It can be accessed by public transport by the Urquiza Line, at Federico Lacroze station, as well as by the Line B subway, at Dorrego station. 21 bus lines and the EcoBici bike-sharing system connect the city with the arena.

Events 

 26 November 2020 - Buenos Aires Trap
 18 September 2021 - La Voz Argentina Live
 21 July 2022 - Nick Jr. Live

Concerts

References 

Indoor arenas in Argentina
Music venues in Argentina